Edward Howard Howard-Gibbon (9 August 1799 – 22 June 1849) was an English surgeon, lawyer, and officer of arms. He was born Edward Howard Gibbon in London and was the second son of the Charles Howard, 11th Duke of Norfolk, and Mary Ann Gibbon—the Duke's longtime mistress.

Edward received a formal education, became a surgeon in his early adult years, and then pursued legal training. He and his family migrated to British Guiana to serve as "Protector of the Slaves" before returning to England. He established himself as an officer of arms at the College of Arms. He served as both York Herald of Arms in Ordinary and Norroy King of Arms.

Edward received his hyphenated surname and family coat of arms in 1842 by Royal Licence with consent of the 13th Duke of Norfolk. He served as the mayor of Arundel during the time of Queen Victoria's official visit in 1846. He died on 22 June 1849 in London and is buried at Saint Nicholas Churchyard in Arundel. He was survived by his wife Amelia Dendy Howard-Gibbon and six children. His oldest daughter, Amelia Frances Howard-Gibbon, later became a well-known artist in Ontario, Canada, and the annual Canadian children's illustration award is named for her.

Arms

References 

1799 births
1849 deaths
19th-century English medical doctors
English officers of arms
Mayors of places in West Sussex
19th-century English lawyers